Mōkau is a small town on the west coast of New Zealand's North Island, located at the mouth of the Mōkau River on the North Taranaki Bight. Mōkau is in the Waitomo District and Waikato region local government areas, just north of the boundary with the New Plymouth District and the Taranaki Region. Prior to 1989, the town was classed as being in Taranaki, and there is still a feeling that the community of interest is most associated with New Plymouth, 90 km to the southwest. State Highway 3 passes through the town on its route from Te Kuiti to Waitara and, eventually, New Plymouth.

The Mōkau River Bridge opened in 1927.

Mōkau is a popular location for whitebaiting and other fishing including for kahawai (mainly found at the river mouth) and snapper (which are found right along the coast in several spots).

Mōkau also has a couple of outstanding surf breaks that, in the right conditions, can produce waves of up to 6 ft (1.8m).

The local marae, Te Kawau Papakainga Marae and Waiopapa meeting house, are affiliated with the Ngāti Maniapoto hapū of Ngāti Rākei, Rōrā and Rungaterangi.

Demographics
The settlement is part of the larger Herangi statistical area.

Mōkau had a population of 117 at the 2018 New Zealand census, an increase of 9 people (8.3%) since the 2013 census, and a decrease of 12 people (−9.3%) since the 2006 census. There were 66 households, comprising 60 males and 57 females, giving a sex ratio of 1.05 males per female. The median age was 58.9 years (compared with 37.4 years nationally), with 6 people (5.1%) aged under 15 years, 12 (10.3%) aged 15 to 29, 57 (48.7%) aged 30 to 64, and 39 (33.3%) aged 65 or older.

Ethnicities were 84.6% European/Pākehā, 23.1% Māori, 2.6% Asian, and 2.6% other ethnicities. People may identify with more than one ethnicity.

Although some people chose not to answer the census's question about religious affiliation, 51.3% had no religion, 35.9% were Christian, and 2.6% had Māori religious beliefs.

Of those at least 15 years old, 3 (2.7%) people had a bachelor's or higher degree, and 42 (37.8%) people had no formal qualifications. The median income was $22,000, compared with $31,800 nationally. 6 people (5.4%) earned over $70,000 compared to 17.2% nationally. The employment status of those at least 15 was that 42 (37.8%) people were employed full-time, 15 (13.5%) were part-time, and 3 (2.7%) were unemployed.

Education

References

Populated places in Waikato
Waitomo District